SCCS may refer to any of the following:

Science and technology 
 Source Code Control System, a method of controlling software versions
 Switching Control Center System, an Operations Support System used by telephone companies from the 1970s to 1990s
Standard cross-cultural sample, an ethnographic dataset widely used in Cross-cultural studies
 Scottish Centre for Carbon Storage, a consortium researching Carbon Storage based in Edinburgh, Scotland
 Standard Cost Coding System, a coding standard developed by Norwegian Oil & Gas Companies to standardize reporting formats
 Standard Cubic Centimeter per Second, a measure of gas throughput or leakage rate
 Scientific Committee on Consumer Safety, a scientific committee in the EU providing opinions on health and safety risks of consumer products and services
Shipboard Command and Control System, a network of computers including large screen displays and a dedicated satellite network for communications. Installed on United States Coast Guard High Endurance Cutters

Organizations 
 Saint Croix Catholic School, an elementary school in Stillwater, MN
 Smith College Campus School, a private elementary lab school run by Smith College
 Santhigiri College of Computer Sciences, India
 Student Conference on Conservation Science, an international conference for students involved with wildlife conservation
 Swarthmore College Computer Society, a campus society at Swarthmore College
 Santa Clarita Christian School, a private K-12 school
Sioux Center Christian School, a private K-8 school
Stop Climate Chaos Scotland, a coalition of Scottish organisations aiming to reverse human-made climate change   
Southern California Computer Society   
 Southern Colorado Computer Solutions Inc., biggest computer service center in Southern Colorado
Sports Car Club of Siouxland, a performance driving organization based out of Sioux Fall South Dakota that focuses on mainly running NASA (National Auto Sports Association) sanctioned autocross events as well as HPDE days and doing work with local charities and veterans associations.

Transportation 
 Small Common Components and Systems, an automobile platform developed by Fiat S.p.A. and General Motors

See also
 SCC (disambiguation)